Sacred Games is an Indian streaming television thriller series based on Vikram Chandra's 2006 novel of the same name. Created by Vikramaditya Motwane, the first season was directed by Motwane and Anurag Kashyap, who produced it under their banner Phantom Films. The story follows a troubled police officer, Sartaj Singh (played by Saif Ali Khan), who receives a phone call from gangster Ganesh Gaitonde (played by Nawazuddin Siddiqui); Gaitonde tells him to save the city within 25 days. The series chronicles the events that follow while tracing Gaitonde's past.

Other cast members include Radhika Apte, Girish Kulkarni, Neeraj Kabi, Geetanjali Thapa, Jeetendra Joshi, Rajshri Deshpande, Karan Wahi, Aamir Bashir, Jatin Sarna, Elnaaz Norouzi Kubra Sait, Surveen Chawla, Pankaj Tripathi, Kalki Koechlin, and Ranvir Shorey. The series was conceived after Erik Barmack, the vice-president of Netflix, contacted Motwane in 2014 to create Indian content for the platform. They opted to adapt Chandra's English novel in the Hindi language, to which Motwane agreed. Varun Grover, Smita Singh, and Vasant Nath wrote the episodes of the first season; Grover, Dhruv Narang, Nihit Bhave, and Pooja Tolani wrote the second season.

Swapnil Sonawane, Sylvester Fonseca and Aseem Bajaj served as director of photography. Aarti Bajaj was the editor and Alokananda Dasgupta composed the background score. The second season was directed by Kashyap and Neeraj Ghaywan. The first season of the series was mostly shot in Mumbai; the second season was shot over different locations of Delhi, Mombasa, Nairobi, Cape Town and Johannesburg. Each episode of Sacred Games is named after a story or character derived from Hindu mythology. The first season premiered on 5 July 2018 on Netflix and received positive reviews with particular praise on performances and writing. The second season premiered on 15 August 2019. A total of 16 episodes have aired over the two seasons with eight in each.

Series overview

Episodes

Season 1 (2018)

Season 2 (2019)

Mini Episodes 
In association with OnePlus India, Netflix India created two mini episodes of Sacred Games as a part of the promotions for the second season.

References

Lists of Indian television series episodes
Television episodes about nuclear war and weapons